Niceland may refer to:

Niceland (band), a 1983 Icelandic heavy metal band
Niceland (Population. 1.000.002), a 2004 Icelandic film
Niceland Seafood
The setting of the fictional game Fix-It Felix Jr. in the 2012 film Wreck-It Ralph